Ljuba Tkalčič is a retired Slovenian nine-pin bowler from Maribor.

Tkalčič was the world champion in 1978 in doubles and in 1982 and 1996 at the team event. She was chosen as the Slovenian Sportwoman of the Year in 1978.

References

Slovenian nine-pin bowling players

Living people

Year of birth missing (living people)